John Diefenbaker (1895–1979) was the 13th prime minister of Canada, serving as such from 1957 to 1963.

Diefenbaker may also refer to the following namesakes of the prime minister:
 Diefenbaker the wolf, an animal character in the television series Due South
 Lake Diefenbaker, a Canadian lake
 Saskatoon John G. Diefenbaker International Airport, a Canadian airport

See also
 CCGS John G. Diefenbaker, a planned Canadian Coast Guard icebreaker